Union Rags (foaled March 3, 2009 in Kentucky) is a champion American Thoroughbred racehorse who won the 2012 Belmont Stakes. He also won the Champagne Stakes and the Saratoga Special Stakes

Background
Union Rags is a bay with a white blaze sired by Dixie Union who won the Haskell Invitational Handicap in 2000 before becoming a successful stallion. His dam, Tempo, was a granddaughter of the 1000 Guineas winner Glad Rags. Union Rags was bred by Phyllis Mills Wyeth, 71 (in 2012), whose parents Alice du Pont and James Mills were prominent owners and breeders of Thoroughbreds. Wyeth, who is married to artist Jamie Wyeth, was a steeplechase rider when young, but at age 20 suffered a broken neck and spinal cord damage in an automobile accident. Initially able to walk with braces, she has used a motorized chair for many years. Wyeth initially sold Union Rags as a yearling, on the advice of tax accountants, but repurchased the horse the next year. She races Union Rags under her nom de course, Chadds Ford Stable.

Racing career

2011: Two-Year-Old
Union Rags made his debut on 12 July when he won a Maiden race at Delaware Park Racetrack. In August, he was moved into Grade II company for the Saratoga Special Stakes and won in "impressive" style by more than seven lengths. On October 8, Union Rags stepped up to Grade I class for the Champagne Stakes at Belmont Park and started the 6/5 favorite against seven opponents. Despite struggling to obtain a clear run on the final turn, he broke clear in the straight to win by more than five lengths from Alpha. Union Rags started favorite for the Breeders' Cup Juvenile at Churchill Downs on November 5. He moved up to challenge the leader Hansen in the straight but "veered" from a straight course before staying on strongly in the closing stages and finishing second by a head. In the voting for the title of American Champion Two-Year-Old Colt, Union Rags finished second to Hansen.

2012: Three-Year-Old Season
In his three-year-old debut, Union Rags won the Fountain of Youth Stakes at Gulfstream Park "comfortably" by four lengths from News Pending, with the favored Discreet Dancer two and a quarter lengths further back in third. At the same course five weeks later, Union Rags started the odds-on favorite for the Florida Derby but finished third behind Take Charge Indy. In the Kentucky Derby, he started second favorite at odds of 5.1/1. Following a poor start, and at one point last in the field, he finished seventh of the twenty runners, seven and a half lengths behind I'll Have Another. Union Rags did not run in the 2012 Preakness Stakes but was entered in the Belmont Stakes on June 9. Following the withdrawal of I'll Have Another, Union Rags started second favorite for the race behind Dullahan. John Velasquez settled the colt in fourth place on the rail as Paynter set the pace. In the straight, Union Rags made steady progress on the inside to overtake Paynter in the final strides and won by a neck. After the race, Matz said, "We always thought this horse had Triple Crown potential."

Union Rags was being prepared for a run in the Haskell Invitational when he sustained a tendon injury in his left front leg which ruled him out for the rest of the season. A week later it was announced that Union Rags would not race again and would be retired to stud.

Stud career
Union Rags entered stud at Lane's End Farm for the 2013 breeding season for a fee of $35,000. His first reported foal, a bay colt out of the Dehere mare Gleaming, was born on January 19, 2014. The colt, now named Confederate Rags, is a winner.

On April 20, 2016, Union Rags had his first winner in Lady Stardust at Aqueduct in a maiden special weight race going  furlongs. On September 3, 2016 the filly Union Strike became his first Grade I winner when she won the Del Mar Debutante Stakes. Union Rags finished second in the 2016 earnings list of first-crop sires based in North America.

Union Rags's most notable progeny include:
 Paradise Woods- Winner of the Gr.I Santa Anita Oaks, Gr.I Zenyatta Stakes
 Union Strike- Winner of the Gr.I Del Mar Debutante Stakes
 Dancing Rags- Winner of the Gr.I Alcibiades Stakes
 Free Drop Billy- Winner of the Gr.I Breeders' Futurity Stakes
 Tequilita- Winner of the Gr.II Forward Gal Stakes and Gr.III Charles Town Oaks 
 Patch- Finished 3rd in  2017 Belmont Stakes, famous for having only one eye
 Musawaah- Winner of the Prix de la Seine in France
 No Dozing- Winner of the Concern Stakes, multiple graded stakes placed
 Heneral Kalentong (Philippines) - Winner of triple crown 2020 [Sweep 3 legs] 
 Union Bell (Philippines) - 2019 Stakes Horse of the year by Philarcom [6wins for 6starts in 2019]

Pedigree

References

External links
 Video titled Union Rags: An American Love Story 

2009 racehorse births
Racehorses bred in Kentucky
Racehorses trained in the United States
Du Pont racehorses
Belmont Stakes winners
Thoroughbred family 13-b